Ricardo Darío Blanco (born 20 June 1990) is an Argentine footballer who plays for Chacarita Juniors.

Career

In 2017, Blanco signed for Kuwaiti club Qadsia.

References

External links
 

1990 births
Living people
People from Mar del Plata
People from General Pueyrredón Partido
Argentine footballers
Argentine expatriate footballers
Association football midfielders
Deportivo Armenio footballers
Defensores de Belgrano de Villa Ramallo players
All Boys footballers
Qadsia SC players
Instituto footballers
Curicó Unido footballers
C.D. Antofagasta footballers
Deportes Iquique footballers
Rangers de Talca footballers
Primera B Metropolitana players
Torneo Federal A players
Primera Nacional players
Kuwait Premier League players
Chilean Primera División players
Primera B de Chile players
Expatriate footballers in Kuwait
Argentine expatriate sportspeople in Kuwait
Argentine expatriates in Kuwait
Expatriate footballers in Chile
Argentine expatriate sportspeople in Chile
Argentine expatriates in Chile
Sportspeople from Mar del Plata